Joshua Selman Nimmak, also known as Apostle Joshua Selman is a Nigerian Gospel minister, instrumentalist, Chemical Engineer, conference speaker, and televangelist. He is the founder and Senior Pastor of the Eternity Network International (ENI). The (ENI) have a program, Koinonia, a gospel fellowship that holds weekly in Samaru, Zaria, Kaduna State, as well as Abuja, Nigeria.

Early life and education 
On 25 June, Selman was born in Jos, Plateau State. He was raised in a Christian home, according to Christian tenets. Selman said in an interview at the Household of David Church, Lagos, that his maternal grandfather was the first president of Church of Christ In Nations (COCIN).

He studied chemical engineering at the Ahmadu Bello University, Zaria, Kaduna State, Nigeria. Selman began his work as a minister of God as an undergraduate, preaching and sharing the gospel to fellow students in school with the help of his friends.

Ministry 
Selman began his Christian ministry as a preacher to student congregations while in university, alongside friends, at various gatherings they got invited to. Selman afterwards founded Eternity Network International (ENI) in March 2011,in Zaria, Kaduna state, commonly called Koinonia, created to impact lives by way of worship and studying the Word of God. It is often said that Apostle Selman is a man of God who has mastered the dynamics of hosting and introducing God’s presence and effortlessly demonstrating the power and potency of God’s Word.

Koinonia Abuja is a branch of Eternity Network International (also known as Koinonia Global) located in Abuja, Nigeria. It was launched on Sunday 28 February 2021 with the first/inaugural teaching delivered by Apostle Joshua Selman Nimmak himself. And it was attended with hundreds of people that overflowed to the road.

Books Written 
Apostle Joshua Selman is the author of several Christian books including; 

 The Mystery of the blood
 How to host the power of God
 How to identify and break the curses
 How to know God
 How to remain powerful
 Six major reasons why you must be prayerful
 How to access heaven’s supply
 Five scripture that will change your destiny
 How to discover your purpose
 How to get Honour
 How to get the power of God
 Spiritual intelligence
 The creative Power of the scripture
 The Mystery of night prayers

Public recognitions 
Joshua Selman was listed by YNaija in December 2018 and April 2020 as one of the 100 most influential Christian ministers in Nigeria.

References

External links
 Apostle Joshua Selman Biography

Nigerian Pentecostal pastors
People from Plateau State
Nigerian writers
1980 births
Living people
People from Kaduna State